Body relative directions (also known as egocentric coordinates) are geometrical orientations relative to a body such as a human person's.
The most common ones are: left and right; forward(s) and backward(s); up and down.
They form three pairs of orthogonal axes.

Traditions and conventions
Since definitions of left and right based on the geometry of the natural environment are unwieldy, in practice, the meaning of relative direction words is conveyed through tradition, acculturation, education, and direct reference. One common definition of up and down uses gravity and the planet Earth as a frame of reference. Since there is a very noticeable force of gravity acting between the Earth and any other nearby object, down is defined as that direction which an object moves in reference to the Earth when the object is allowed to fall freely. Up is then defined as the opposite direction of down. Another common definition uses a human body, standing upright, as a frame of reference. In that case, up is defined as the direction from feet to head, perpendicular to the surface of the Earth. In most cases, up is a directionally oriented position generally opposite to that of the pull of gravity.

In situations where a common frame of reference is needed, it is most common to use an egocentric view. A simple example is road signage. Another example is stage blocking, where "stage left" "stage right" are, by convention, defined from the point of view of actors facing the audience. "Upstage" and "downstage" do not follow gravity but by convention mean away from and towards the audience. An example of a non-egocentric view is page layout, where the relative terms "upper half" "left margin," etc. are defined in terms of the observer but employed in reverse for a type compositor, returning to an egocentric view. In medicine and science, where precise definitions are crucial, relative directions (left and right) are the sides of the organism, not those of the observer. The same is true in heraldry, where left and right in a coat of arms is treated as if the shield were being held by the armiger. To avoid confusion, Latin terminology is employed: dexter and sinister for right and left. Proper right and proper left are terms mainly used to describe artistic images, and overcome the potential confusion that a figure's "own" right or "proper right" hand is on the left hand as the viewer sees it from the front.

Forward and backward may be defined by referring to an object's or person's motion. Forward is defined as the direction in which the object is moving. Backward is then defined as the opposite direction to forward. Alternatively, 'forward' may be the direction pointed by the observer's nose, defining 'backward' as the direction from the nose to the sagittal border in the observer's skull. With respect to a ship 'forward' would indicate the relative position of any object lying in the direction the ship is pointing. For symmetrical objects, it is also necessary to define forward and backward in terms of expected direction. Many mass transit trains are built symmetrically with paired control booths, and definitions of forward, backward, left, and right are temporary.

Given significant distance from the magnetic poles, one can figure which hand is which using a magnetic compass and the sun. Facing the sun, before noon, the north pointer of the compass points to the "left" hand. After noon, it points to the "right".

Geometry of the natural environment
 A right-hand rule is one common way to relate three principal directions. For many years a fundamental question in physics was whether a left-hand rule would be equivalent. Many natural structures, including human bodies, follow a certain "handedness", but it was widely assumed that nature did not distinguish the two possibilities. This changed with the discovery of parity violations in particle physics. If a sample of cobalt-60 atoms is magnetized so that they spin counterclockwise around some axis, the beta radiation resulting from their nuclear decay will be preferentially directed opposite that axis. Since counter-clockwise may be defined in terms of up, forward, and right, this experiment unambiguously differentiates left from right using only natural elements: if they were reversed, or the atoms spun clockwise, the radiation would follow the spin axis instead of being opposite to it.

Nautical terminology
Bow, stern, port, starboard, fore and aft are nautical terms that convey an impersonal relative direction in the context of the moving frame of persons aboard a ship. The need for impersonal terms is most clearly seen in a rowing shell where the majority of the crew face aft ("backwards"), hence the oars to their right are actually on the port side of the boat. Rowers eschew the terms left, right, port and starboard in favor of stroke-side and bow-side. The usage derives from the tradition of having the stroke (the rower closest to the stern of the boat) oar on the port side of the boat.

Cultures without relative directions
Most human cultures use relative directions for reference, but there are exceptions. Australian Aboriginal peoples like the Guugu Yimithirr, Kaiadilt and Thaayorre have no words denoting the egocentric directions in their language; instead, they exclusively refer to cardinal directions, even when describing small-scale spaces. For instance, if they wanted someone to move over on the car seat to make room, they might say "move a bit to the east". To tell someone where exactly they left something in their house, they might say, "I left it on the southern edge of the western table." Or they might warn a person to "look out for that big ant just north of your foot". Other peoples "from Polynesia to Mexico and from Namibia to Bali" similarly have predominantly "geographic languages". American Sign Language makes heavy use of geographical direction through absolute orientation.

Left-right discrimination and left-right confusion 
Left-right discrimination (LRD) refers to a person's ability to differentiate between left and right. The inability to accurately differentiate between left and right is known as left-right confusion (LRC). According to research performed by John R. Clarke of Drexel University, LRC affects approximately 15% of the population. People who have LRC can typically perform daily navigational tasks, such as driving according to road signs or following a map, but may have difficulty performing actions that require a precise understanding of directional commands, such as ballroom dancing.

Prevalence 
Data regarding LRC prevalence is primarily based on behavioral studies, self-assessments, and surveys. Gormley and Brydges found that in a group of 800 adults, 17% of women and 9% of men reported difficulty differentiating between left and right. Such studies suggest that women are more prone to LRC than men, with women reporting higher rates of LRC in both accuracy and speed of response.

Sex differences 
The Bergen Left-Right Discrimination (BLRD) test is designed to measure individual performance in LRD accuracy. However, this test has been criticized for incorporating tasks that require the use of additional strategies, such as mental rotation (MR). Because men have been shown to consistently outperform women in MR tasks, tests involving the use of this particular strategy may present alternative cognitive demands and lead to inaccurate assessment of LRD performance. An extended version of the BLRD test was designed to allow for differential evaluation of LRD and MR abilities, in which subtests were created with either high or low demands on mental rotation. Results from these studies did not find sex differences in LRD performance when mental rotation demands were low. Another study found that sex differences in left-right discrimination existed in terms of self-reported difficulty, but not in actual tested ability.

Alternatively, studies focused on LRD as a phenomenon distinct from MR concluded that there are sex differences present in LRD. Scientists controlled for MR demands, potential menstrual cycle effects, and other hormone fluctuations, and determined that the neurocognitive mechanisms that support LRD are different for men and women. This research revealed that inferior parietal and right angular gyrus activation were correlated with LRD performance in both men and women. Women also demonstrated increased prefrontal activation, but did not exhibit greater bilateral activation. Additionally, no correlation was found between LRD accuracy and brain activation, or between brain activation and reaction time, for either sex. These results indicate that there are sex differences in the neurocognitive mechanisms underlying LRD performance; however, findings did not suggest that women are more prone to LRC than men.

Acquisition and comparison 
Humans are constantly making decisions about spatial relations; however, some spatial relations, such as left-right, are commonly confused, while other spatial relations, such as up-down, above-below, and front-back, are seldom, if ever, mistaken. The ability to categorize and compartmentalize space is an essential tool for navigating this 3D world; an ability shown to develop in early infancy. Infant ability to visually match above-below and left-right relations appears to diminish in early toddlerhood, as language acquisition may complicate verbal labeling. Children learn to verbally discriminate between above-below relations around the age of three, and learn left-right linguistic labels between the ages of six and seven; however, these classifications may only exist in the linguistic context. In other words, children may learn the terms for left and right without having developed a cognitive representation to allow for the accurate application of such spatial distinctions.

Research seeks to explain the neural activity associated with left-right discrimination, attempting to identify differences in the encoding, consolidation, and retrieval of left-right versus above-below relations. One study found that neural activity patterns for left-right and above-below distinctions are represented differently in the brain, leading to the theory that these spatial judgements are supported by separate cognitive mechanisms. Experiments used magnetoencephalography (MEG) to record neural activity during a computerized nonverbal task, examining left-right and above-below differences in encoding and working memory. Results showed differences in neural activity patterns in the right cerebellum, right superior temporal gyrus, and left temporoparietal junction during the encoding phase, and indicated differential neural activity in the inferior parietal, right superior temporal, and right cerebellum regions in the working memory tests.

The role of distraction 
Although some individuals may struggle with LRD more than others, discriminating between left and right in the face of distraction has been shown to impair even the most proficient individual's ability to accurately differentiate between the two. This issue is of particular importance to medical students, clinicians and health care professionals, where distraction in the workplace and LRD inaccuracy can lead to severe consequences, including laterality errors and wrong-side surgeries. Laterality errors in the field of aviation may also lead to equally devastating results, for example, causing a major airline crash.

Distraction has a significant impact on LRD accuracy, and the type of distraction can alter the magnitude of these effects. For example, cognitive distraction, which occurs when an individual is not directly focused on the task at hand, has a more profound effect on LRD performance than auditory distraction, such as the presence of continuous ambient noise. Additionally, in the field of health care, it has been noted that mental rotation is often involved in making left-right distinctions, such as when a medical practitioner is facing their patient and must adjust for the opposite left-right relations.

See also 
 Anatomical terms of location
 Cardinal direction
 Cerebral hemisphere
 Clock position
 Dexter and sinister
 Direction determination
 Horizontal direction
 Dextral and sinistral
 Handedness
 List of international common standards
 Orientation (geometry)
 Port and starboard
 Rotation
 Sense of direction
 Slant direction
 Topographical disorientation
 Visuospatial dysgnosia
 Windward and leeward

References

Orientation (geometry)